Sangvi Budruk is a beautiful village in Yawal Taluka of Jalgaon district in northwestern part of the state of Maharashtra, India. It is situated near the Satpuda range. Sangvi lies in the Khandesh region, and on Burhanpur - Ankleshwar National Highway 4

Geography
It is situated in yawal wildlife sanctuary

Education
Jyoti Vidya Mandir Highschool and Junior College & ITI Department.

Villages in Jalgaon district